Kira Bertrand (born July 28, 1992) is a footballer who plays for League1 Ontario club Woodbridge Strikers SC. She represents the Dominica women's national team. She scored the first competitive goal for the Dominica woman's national team program with her goal in 2009 while playing with the U20s.

Early life
Bertrand was born in Canada to Trevor and Elsie Bertrand. She played youth soccer with North Mississauga SC.

College career
Bertrand attended Southwestern Oklahoma State University in the United States, where she played for the women's soccer team. In 2012, she helped SWOSU to a second-place finish in its first year as members of the Great American Conference (GAC). She was named the GAC Defender of the Year three times from 2011 to 2013, also earning All-Central Region honours in 2012 and 2013. In addition she was also a three-time First Team All-GAC selection and two-time All-GAC tournament choice. In November 2013, she was named GAC Defender of the Week. In total, she appeared in 75 games for the Bulldogs, and afterwards joined the team as a graduate assistant coach, while she completed her master's degree. She served as team captain in her senior year and was a nine-time GAC Defensive Player of the Week and was named team MVP twice. In 2015, she returned to SOWSU as an assistant coach.

Club career
In 2014, she played with K-W United FC in the USL W-League.

From 2015 to 2017, Bertrand played for North Mississauga SC in League1 Ontario. In 2015, she won the League Cup with North Mississauga and was named a League First-Team All Star. In 2016, she played in the mid-season league All-Star Game and at the end of the season was once again named a League First Team All-Star. In 2017, she was again selected to play in the league's mid-season All-Star game and was named a league First Team All-Star for the third consecutive year.

She then began playing for the Woodbridge Strikers in League1 Ontario beginning in 2018. In 2018, she was named a league Third-Team All Star. In 2020, she was named to the League1 Ontario Women's All-Time Best XI.

International career
Bertrand represents the Dominica women's national football team. She serves as team captain in 2022.

In 2009, she made her debut for the program with the Dominica U20 at the qualification tournament for the 2010 CONCACAF Women's U-20 Championship, where she scored the first competitive goal for the Dominican Women’s National Program. In 2010, she made her debut for the senior team at the 2010 World Cup qualifiers.

Personal
She is the older sister of fellow Dominica international player Kylee Bertrand.

References

External links

SWOSU Statistics

1992 births
Living people
Dominica women's footballers
Women's association football defenders
Southwestern Oklahoma State Bulldogs women's soccer players
Dominica women's international footballers
Dominica expatriate footballers
Dominica expatriate sportspeople in the United States
Expatriate women's soccer players in the United States
Soccer players from Brampton
Canadian women's soccer players
League1 Ontario (women) players
Canadian expatriate women's soccer players
Canadian expatriate sportspeople in the United States
Canadian people of Dominica descent
North Mississauga SC (women) players
Woodbridge Strikers (women) players